The eighteenth government of Israel was formed by Menachem Begin on 20 June 1977, following the May 1977 elections. It was the first government in Israeli political history led by a right-wing party, with the coalition consisting of Begin's Likud (which included Ariel Sharon's Shlomtzion, which had merged into Likud shortly after the election), the National Religious Party and Agudat Yisrael. Begin's government also contained Moshe Dayan who had been elected to the Knesset on the Alignment's list. Following Dayan's acceptance of a place in the cabinet, he was expelled from the party and sat as an independent MK, though he only remained in the cabinet for four months.

Begin initially held four portfolios in addition to the position of Prime Minister whilst he negotiated with Dash, which had won 15 seats, making it the third largest party in the Knesset. Negotiations were concluded in October 1977, and Dash joined the government, taking the four portfolios plus a Deputy Prime Minister position (marking the first time the country had more than one Deputy PM). However, after its collapse in 1978 all its MKs except Yigael Yadin left the government.

Defense Minister Ezer Weizman lost his job in May 1980 following confrontations with Begin and Ariel Sharon. Following the 1978 South Lebanon conflict Weizman proposed forming a national unity government with the Alignment to stimulate the peace process. The idea was dismissed by Begin, leading to Weizman criticising Likud for being stubborn and uncompromising. Following a dispute with Sharon over settlements in the occupied territories, Weizman considered establishing a new party with Moshe Dayan and was expelled from Likud. After a spell out of politics, Weizman founded a new party, Yahad, and returned to the Knesset following the 1984 elections, whilst Dayan founded Telem.

Finance Minister Yigal Hurvitz also left the government following disagreements within Likud; in January 1981 he and two other MKs left Likud and set up Rafi – National List. Hurvitz later defected again to Telem.

The government was in office until 5 August 1981 when the nineteenth government took office following the 1981 elections.

Cabinet members

1 Although Landau was not an MK during the ninth Knesset, he had previously been an MK for Likud.

References

External links
Ninth Knesset: Government 18 Knesset website

 18
1977 establishments in Israel
1981 disestablishments in Israel
Cabinets established in 1977
Cabinets disestablished in 1981
1977 in Israeli politics
1978 in Israeli politics
1979 in Israeli politics
1980 in Israeli politics
1981 in Israeli politics
 18
 18